"Who We Be" is a song by American hip hop recording artist DMX, released as the second single from his fourth album The Great Depression (2001). The song peaked at number 60 on the Billboard Hot 100. It was nominated for the Grammy Award for Best Rap Solo Performance, but lost to "Get Ur Freak On" by Missy Elliott. An edited version was featured in the 2002 sports game Street Hoops.

Music video
The music video was directed by Joseph Kahn and produced by Lanette Phillips and Stefan Belafonte, and it features DMX rapping the song from inside a prison cell.

Track listing
Europe 12-inch single 33 ⅓ RPM 
A1 "Who We Be" (LP Version)
B1 "Who We Be" (Radio Edit)
B2 "Who We Be" (Instrumental)

US 12-inch single
A1 "Who We Be" (Radio Edit)
A2 "Who We Be" (Album Version)
B1 "Who We Be" (Instrumental)
B2 "Who We Be" (Acapella)

United Kingdom CD/maxi single
"Who We Be" (Radio Edit) – 4:19
"We Right Here" (Radio Edit) – 4:02
"Who We Be" (Explicit Version) – 4:48
"We Right Here" (Explicit Version) – 4:31

United Kingdom enhanced CD single
Track listing:
"Who We Be" (LP Version) – 4:48
"Who We Be" (Radio Edit) – 4:26
"We Right Here" (LP Version) – 4:28
Video - "Who We Be"

Personnel
Vocals: DMX, Dustin Adams
Mastered by: Tony Dawsey
Recorded by: Jaime Weddle and Otto D'Angolo
Mixed by: Brian Stanley at The Hit Factory Criteria (Miami, Florida)
Artwork [Design]: Akisia Grigsby
Artwork [Direction]:- Akisia Grigsby, Earl "DMX" Simmons
Photography: Vincent Soyez

Charts

References

2001 singles
DMX (rapper) songs
Music videos directed by Joseph Kahn
Def Jam Recordings singles
Ruff Ryders Entertainment singles
2001 songs
Songs written by DMX (rapper)